Hans Götz (2 June 1919 – 4 August 1943) was a former Luftwaffe fighter ace and recipient of the Knight's Cross of the Iron Cross during World War II. Hans Götz was credited with 82 victories in 600 combat missions. He claimed three victories over the Western Front.

Career
Götz was born on 2 June 1922 in Stuttgart, the capital of the Free People's State of Württemberg of the Weimar Republic.

On 22 February 1943, Götz was appointed Staffelkapitän (squadron leader) of 2. Staffel of Jagdgeschwader 54 (JG 54—54th Fighter Wing). He succeeded Oberleutnant Siegfried Graf Matuschka who was transferred. When on 6 July Major Reinhard Seiler was wounded in combat, Götz was temporarily given the position of Gruppenkommandeur (group commander) of I. Gruppe of JG 54 until the new commander Hauptmann Gerhard Homuth took command on 1 August. The following day, Homuth was killed in action and Götz again assumed command of the Gruppe. Only two days later, on 4 August, Götz was killed in action following combat with Ilyushin Il-2 ground attack aircraft. His Focke Wulf Fw 190 A-5 (Werknummer 1119—factory number) crashed and exploded northeast of Karachev.

Summary of career

Aerial victory claims
According to US historian David T. Zabecki, Götz was credited with 82 aerial victories. Mathews and Foreman, authors of Luftwaffe Aces — Biographies and Victory Claims, researched the German Federal Archives and found documentation for 82 aerial victory claims. This number includes 79 claims on the Eastern Front and three over the Western Allies.

Victory claims were logged to a map-reference (PQ = Planquadrat), for example "PQ 29323". These sectors were then subdivided into 36 smaller units to give a location area 3 × 4 km in size.

Awards
 Honour Goblet of the Luftwaffe on 10 November 1941 as Leutnant and pilot
 German Cross in Gold on 2 July 1942 as Oberleutnant in the I./Jagdgeschwader 54
 Knight's Cross of the Iron Cross on 23 December 1942 as Oberleutnant and pilot in the 2./Jagdgeschwader 54

Notes

References

Citations

Bibliography

External links

1919 births
1943 deaths
Luftwaffe personnel killed in World War II
German World War II flying aces
Luftwaffe pilots
Military personnel from Stuttgart
People from the Free People's State of Württemberg
Recipients of the Gold German Cross
Recipients of the Knight's Cross of the Iron Cross
Aviators killed by being shot down